Vinyl Cafe Inc. Coast to Coast Story Service (2002) is a two-CD album by Stuart McLean released by Vinyl Cafe Productions.

This collection of stories was taken from CBC Radio concerts that were recorded in Banff, Calgary, Toronto, Kingston, and Outremont.

Recorded in concert for the CBC Radio show The Vinyl Cafe.

Track listing
Disc 1
 "Dave Goes Babysitting" - 24:33
 "Morley's Birthday Bash" - 23:34
 "Dave Gives A Speech" - 24:36

Disc 2
 "Kenny Wong's Practical Jokes" - 26:49
 "Dave's Wedding Ring" - 20:13
 "Christmas With Rasheeda And Ahmeer" - 23:19

See also
Stuart McLean
The Vinyl Cafe
List of Dave and Morley stories

References

External links
 Vinyl Cafe with Stuart McLean - The Official Website

Stuart McLean albums
2002 live albums